Adavi  is a 2020 Tamil language romantic action film directed by G. Ramesh and starring Vinoth Kishan and Ammu Abhirami in the lead roles while the producer, Sambasivam, makes his film debut in a negative role.

Plot 
A tribe in a mountain tries to save their land from a greedy estate owner.

Cast 
 Vinoth Kishan as Murugan
 Ammu Abhirami as Valli
 R. N. R. Manohar as an estate owner
Vishnupriya as Valli's friend
 Muthuraman
 K Sambasivam
 Attapadi Radhakrishnan
 Robo Chandru
 Munnar Ramesh

Production 
G. Ramesh, who previously directed Kallattam (2016), signed a film featuring several new faces in addition to the main actors. The film revolves around a land problem between the rich and the natives. The film was shot in Mettukal, near Kothagiri, in 20 days in 2 schedules.

Soundtrack
Soundtrack was composed by Sarath Jada.
 Thalattu - Sarath Jada
 Pattuvana - Attapadi Radhakrishnan
 Rangamma - Attapadi Radhakrishnan
 Maman Magale - Attapadi Radhakishnan

Release 
The Times of India gave the film two out of five stars and wrote that "The dated filmmaking, with earnest but raw performances, and the overly melodramatic treatment ensure that we are never emotionally touched". The Deccan Chronicle gave the film the same rating and criticized the film's screenplay while praising the cinematography.

References

External links 
 

2020 films
2020s Tamil-language films
Films set in forests
Indian drama films